Alerce Milenario is the largest tree in Chile's Alerce Costero National Park. While it has been on the list of oldest trees, this Alerce tree (Fitzroya cupressoides) is now rivalling others to be possibly the oldest tree in the world.

Jonathan Barichivich and Antonio Lara, of the Austral University of Chile, bored a partial hole into the tree as far as possible without damaging it. They used an increment borer—a T-shaped drill to excise a narrow cylinder of wood without harming the tree. The partial plug of wood yielded approximately 2,400 tightly spaced growth rings. They then used statistical modelling based on data from 2,400 trees. Barichivich's age estimate for the Alerce Milenario was 5,484 years old and with certainty that the tree is at least 5,000 years old.

Geography 
The Alerce Milenario Tree is located in a ravine, in the Alerce Coster National Park, a Chilean Rain Forest. The park is 137 hectares (340 acres), and up to 1,048 m (3,438 feet) above sea level. It has a rainy temperate climate with rains all year round. Its average temperature is 12° Celsius. The park receives 10,000 visitors a year who visit the tree.

Description and condition of the tree 
At more than 4 meters across much of the crown fell away and part of the trunk died. Alerce Milenario tree is covered with lichens and mosses. It is estimated to have over 5000 rings. If accurate, that would be more than 100 years older than the current record holder. Barichivich said "Only 28 percent of the tree is actually alive, most of which is in the roots, so when people walk across the nearby soil, they're actively damaging the last remaining living parts of the tree."

Dendrochronology research needed 
Dendrochronology (or tree-ring dating) is the scientific method of dating tree rings (also called growth rings) to the exact year they were formed. As well as dating them, this can give data for dendroclimatology, the study of climate and atmospheric conditions during different periods in history from wood. Ed Cook from Columbia University has stated “The only way to truly determine the age of a tree is by dendrochronologically counting the rings and that requires all rings being present or accounted for”. 

However, the method dendrochronology comes with challenges, primarily due to the need to examine the internal of a tree. This can cause damage, and the borers used can be insufficient for the width of some trees, particularly older species where the internal core is damaged or rotten. The method has so far yielded evidence of approximately 2400 growth rings, but because the borer used could not reach the center of the tree, modelling was used to predict an overall age estimate of more than 5,000 years with 80% certainty.

Protection 
It is hoped the findings of the age of the tree will lead Chile's government to better protect it. Chile's National Forest Corporation has stated it has increased protections for the tree, and added rangers to the park.

See also 
 List of individual trees
 List of oldest trees

References

Further reading 
Ancient Tree in Chile Could Be World's Oldest, Scientists Say - Yale School of The Environment on 05-27-2022
Chile could be home to world's oldest tree, study suggests - Reuters on 05-26-2022
Is the world's oldest tree growing in a ravine in Chile? - Science.org on 05-20-2022

Alerce Costero National Park
Valdivian temperate rainforest
Trees of Chile
National parks of Chile
Tourist attractions in Chile
Oldest trees
Destroyed individual trees
Natural history of Chile
Ecoregions of Chile
Temperate rainforests